Abhayapuri South Assembly constituency is one of the 126 constituencies of the Assam Legislative Assembly, in Assam, northeastern India.

Abhayapuri South (constituency number 35) is one of the 3 constituencies located in Bongaigaon district. It is reserved for scheduled castes.

Abhayapuri South is part of Barpeta Lok Sabha constituency along with 9 other assembly segments, namely, Bongaigaon and Abhayapuri North in this district, Patacharkuchi, Barpeta, Jania, Baghbar, Sarukhetri and Chenga in Barpeta district and Dharmapur in Nalbari district.

Town Details 

Following are the details of Abhayapuri South:

 Country: India.
 State: Assam.
 District: Bongaigaon
 Lok Sabha Constituency: Barpeta.
 Assembly Categorisation: Rural.
 Literacy Level: 69.74%.
 Eligible Electors as per 2021 General Elections: 206,843 Eligible Electors. Male Electors:91,211. Female Electors:83,652.
 Geographic Co-Ordinates: 26°17’36.2"N 90°34’36.1"E.
 Total Area Covered: 435 square kilometres.
 Area Includes: Abhayapuri thana [excluding the villages specified in item (15) of the Appendix] in Goalpara sub-division of Bongaigaon district of Assam.
 Inter State Border : Bongaigaon.
 Number Of Polling Stations: Year 2011-206,Year 2016-240,Year 2021-35.

Members of Legislative Assembly 
1978: Rabindra Nath Choudhury, Janata Party.
1985: Ratneswar Sarkar, Independent.
1991: Chandan Kumar Sarkar, Indian National Congress.
1996: Rabin Banikya, Asom Gana Parishad.
2001: Chandan Kumar Sarkar, Indian National Congress.
2006: Rabin Banikya, Asom Gana Parishad.
2011: Chandan Kumar Sarkar, Indian National Congress.
2016: Ananta Kumar Malo, All India United Democratic Front.
2021: Pradip Sarkar, Indian National Congress.

Election results

2016 result

2011 result

References

External links 
 

Assembly constituencies of Assam